Mehmet Nida Tüfekçi (1 March 1929 in Akdağmadeni, Yozgat – 18 September 1993 in İstanbul) was a Turkish folk music artist.

Career
He sang, played the bağlama and composed folk songs.

He was also director and conductor of the TRT's Ankara Radio Turkish Folk Music Ensemble for many years from 1966.

State artist
He was awarded the title of State Artist, the highest distinction for artists in Turkey, in 1991, only two years before his death.

Personal life
His wife Neriman Altındağ Tüfekçi also was a Turkish folk singer. They left behind a daughter, Gamze (born 1958).

He died of a heart attack.

Legacy
A concert was organized in Muğla in his memory on 20 December 2013.

See also 
List of Turkish musicians

References

External links
Nida Tüfekçi playing the bağlama and singing "Dersini Almış da Ediyor Ezber" at TRT4 TV

Turkish folk musicians
1929 births
1993 deaths
People from Akdağmadeni
State Artists of Turkey
Bağlama players
Turkish radio personalities